Scorpiurus aramoana is a species of fly in the family Dolichopodidae. It is endemic to New Zealand. The species was first discovered in December 2017 on the saltmarsh mudflats of Aramoana near Dunedin in the South Island of New Zealand, and later found further south in the Catlins.

References 

Insects described in 2018
Diptera of New Zealand
Hydrophorinae
Endemic insects of New Zealand